Mastax brittoni is a species of beetle in the family Carabidae that can be found in Taiwan.

References

Mastax brittoni
Beetles described in 1952
Beetles of Asia